Farm to Market Road 170 (FM 170) is a  highway maintained by the Texas Department of Transportation (TxDOT) in Presidio and Brewster counties in Texas. The route, known locally as the River Road, runs along the United States side of the Rio Grande which in Texas forms the international boundary between the U.S. and Mexico. The road runs from Candelaria through the city of Presidio as well as several smaller communities and former settlements to State Highway 118 in Study Butte near Big Bend National Park. The road also passes through the southern portion of Big Bend Ranch State Park.

The highway was first designated in 1945 and over the years was gradually extended outward from Presidio. Eastern portions of the road in Brewster County, however, had several previous highway designations going back to 1939.

In addition to SH 118 in Study Butte, FM 170 has highway intersections in Presidio with U.S. Route 67 and its auxiliary route Business U.S. Route 67-A along with State Highway Spur 203.

History

Previous designations in Brewster County

State Highway 227
The earliest portion of the present route to be designated as part of the state highway system was the section between Terlingua and Study Butte which was assigned in September 1939 as part of a spur to SH 227. This spur continued on to connect with the main highway at the present junction of the north end Old Maverick Road and the road to Panther Junction within Big Bend National Park. SH 227 at the same time was newly designated as a road from Santa Elena Canyon to Panther Junction via the Old Maverick Road and then to Persimmon Gap and Marathon along the present US 385.

State Highway 118
One month later, this spur was reassigned as part of SH 118. At that time, SH 118 south of Alpine departed from its present route near Adobe Walls Mountain to Terlingua rather than going directly to Study Butte as it does today. From Terlingua, SH 118 then proceeded eastward through Study Butte to SH 227.

State Highway Spur 121
In 1941, the designation of SH 118 along the road between Alpine and Terlingua was canceled and returned to county maintenance. The road from Terlingua through Study Butte to SH 227 was re-designated as Spur 121 until that designation was canceled in 1946. The portion within the newly created Big Bend National Park was incorporated into the park's road system. The remainder between Terlingua to the park boundary near Study Butte reverted to county maintenance.

Ranch to Market Road 2462
By 1951, SH 118 had been incrementally extended south of Alpine to the park boundary along its present alignment through Study Butte and over the portion of the former spur road to the park boundary. State maintenance between Terlingua and Study Butte was reestablished as RM 2462 in 1956. RM 2462 was then extended westward to the Presidio County line just west of Lajitas in 1957.

Current designation and extensions beyond Presidio
FM 170 was originally designated as a  highway from US 67 in Presidio northwest to Ochoa. On December 16, 1948, the road was extended to the northwest an additional  to Adobes and to the southeast to a point  from Presidio. On July 15, 1949, the road was extended  to Redford. The road was extended on October 29, 1953 further to the northwest  to Pinto Canyon. Further construction to the northwest would then undergo a long hiatus.

On July 28, 1955, with construction focusing toward the southeast, the road was extended  beyond Redford. On October 31, 1958, the road was extended an additional , and FM 170 was changed to RM 170. On February 5, 1960, RM 170 received its final extension to the southeast to RM 2462 at the Brewster County line.

Between 1967 and 1981, RM 170 was changed to FM 170. Ruidosa would remain the northwest terminus for fourteen years until the road was finally extended an additional  to its present terminus at Candelaria on October 21, 1981. Also, sometime between June 2, 1967 and October 21, 1981, RM 170 was changed to FM 170.

On June 18, 1996, FM 170 was rerouted on Presidio's north side to follow concurrently along the route of US 67 and Bus. US 67-A abandoning a short section of road east of US 67. This was due to the relocation of US 67 away from the town center toward the Presidio-Ojinaga International Bridge with much of US 67's former route through town being replaced by the newly designated Bus. US 67-A, Spur 203, and Spur 310.

Route description

FM 170 begins at Candelaria at the termination of the Chispa Road, a rugged, unpaved county road in Presidio and Jeff Davis counties that connects to US 90 by way of FM 2017 between Van Horn and Valentine. Although the two-lane road follows along the Rio Grande between Candelaria and Presidio, the river is largely obscured from the road by farm land.

Approximately  from Candelaria, the road reaches Ruidosa where the road passes directly by the ruins of an historic adobe Catholic church and intersects the Pinto Canyon Road, an unpaved county road to Marfa by way of RM 2810. Along the remaining  to Presidio, the road passes through the former communities or ghost towns of Chinati, Adobes, Indio, and Ochoa.

The road merges with US 67 just north of Presidio, the only incorporated city along its route. At a point where Bus. US 67-A separates from US 67, FM 170 follows the business route. At Erma Ave., the route intersects Spur 203 and the route turns south to O'Reilly St. where FM 170 separates from Bus. US 67-A. FM 170 then follows a winding path west along O'Reilly St., then south along Hurd Ave. where it crosses the South Orient Rail Line, then west along Millington Blvd., then south along Fourth St. before leaving the city's street grid to the southwest. Just outside Presidio, FM 170 passes Fort Leaton State Historic Site.

West of Redford, FM 170 intersects Casa Piedra Road, an unpaved county route that provides access to the headquarters of Big Bend Ranch State Park and Marfa by way of RM 169. From this point forward to Lajitas, much of the road passes through Big Bend Ranch State Park where the road becomes more mountainous with sharp curves and steep grades. Within the park, there are several campgrounds, picnic areas, trail heads, and an old movie set. The road briefly turns away from the river at Colorado Canyon.

At Lajitas, the road permanently turns away from the river to go to Terlingua. Just east of Lajitas is the Texas Parks and Wildlife Department's Barton Warnock Environmental Education Center. At Terlingua, FM 170 passes near the old ghost town of this former mining community. The road then terminates at Study Butte  from the entrance to Big Bend National Park.

Major intersections

See also

References

External links

0170
Transportation in Brewster County, Texas
Transportation in Presidio County, Texas